Rawa Blues Festival (pronounced rava) is the world's largest indoor blues festival. The festival was named after the Rawa River, which flows through the city of Katowice in Poland. The first edition was held in April 1981.

Among the highlights of past festivals were: Luther Allison, Junior Wells, Koko Taylor, Carey Bell, John Cephas and Phil Wiggins, C. J. Chenier, Nora Jean Bruso, Rory Block, Little Charlie & the Nightcats, as well as many Polish blues musicians such as Tadeusz Nalepa, Slawek Wierzcholski, Dżem and many others.

See also

List of blues festivals
List of folk festivals

References

External links

 

Music festivals established in 1981 
Culture in Katowice
Silesian culture
Music festivals in Poland
Blues festivals in Poland
Folk festivals in Poland
1981 establishments in Poland
Tourist attractions in Silesian Voivodeship